First or 1st is the ordinal form of the number one (#1).

First or 1st may also refer to:

World record, specifically the first instance of a particular achievement
Grand opening earliest instance of something

Arts and media

Music 
 1$T, American rapper, singer-songwriter, DJ, and record producer

Albums
 1st (album), a 1983 album by Streets
 1st (Rasmus EP), a 1995 EP by The Rasmus, frequently identified as a single
 1ST, a 2021 album by SixTones
 First (Baroness EP), an EP by Baroness
 First (Ferlyn G EP), an EP by Ferlyn G
 First (David Gates album), an album by David Gates
 First (O'Bryan album), an album by O'Bryan
 First (Raymond Lam album), an album by Raymond Lam
 First, an album by Denise Ho

Songs
 "First" (Cold War Kids song), a song by Cold War Kids
 "First" (Lindsay Lohan song), a song by Lindsay Lohan

Education
 First grade, in primary education
 First, a British undergraduate degree classification

Geography
 First (Grindelwald), a minor summit below the Schwarzhorn in the Bernese Alps in Switzerland
 First (Kandersteg), a mountain in Bernese Alps in Switzerland

Science and technology
 First (communications), principles of communications
 First light, a milestone in telescope commissioning

Other uses
 Front-runner, or the position of first
 FirstGroup, a British transportation company operating buses, trains, coaches and trams
 First Racing, a former racing team

See also

 FIRST (disambiguation)
 FST (disambiguation)
 
 
 
 
 
 Ist (disambiguation)
 One (disambiguation)
 The First (disambiguation)
 La 1ère (disambiguation), "Première"
 Premiere (disambiguation), first
 Proto-, an English prefix meaning "first"